Lt. Gen. Ahmad Yunus Mokoginta, commonly known as A. Y. Mokoginta (28 April 1921 – 11 January 1984), was an Indonesian military officer and a signatory to the Petition of 50, coming from an aristocratic family in Bolaang Mongondow.

Early life 
Born in Kotamobagu, North Sulawesi on April 28, 1921, Mokoginta was the son of Abraham Patra Mokoginta, a former jogogu (prime minister) of the Bolaang Mongondow Kingdom. Moving to Java with his father, he studied at an Algemene Middelbare School in Semarang.

Military career
In 1941, he entered the Koninklijke Militaire Academie in Bandung, relocated after the German occupation of the Netherlands. During the Japanese occupation and after the Proclamation of Indonesian independence, he was involved in youth movements. He was staff officer in Brigade III of the Siliwangi Division and served as an aide to General Oerip Soemohardjo. He served as Commander of the Java Regional Military Police, replacing Gatot Soebroto from 1948 to 1950.

In 1949, after the transfer of power from the Netherlands to the Republic of Indonesia, Mokoginta was elected as the officer in charge of the Military Territorial Region in East Indonesia. He was appointed to lead Territory VII which was headquartered in Makassar with the rank of Lieutenant Colonel. On 5 April 1950 he was captured by forces led by Captain Andi Aziz during the Makassar Uprising. In August 1950 Territory VII was changed to Kodam VII/Wirabuana and Lt. Col. A. Y. Mokoginta was replaced with commander Alexander Evert Kawilarang.

He was the first SSKAD Commander from 1951 to 1953 and team leader of the Army Doctrine Committee, formulating the TNI's ideology in order to deal with infiltration from foreign powers and interference from within the country. Together with Colonel Soewarto, they prepared SESKOAD as an institution that produced modern Indonesian officers. He was also the Head of the Education Curriculum Formulating Team at the Indonesian Military Academy at Magelang.

He was in Medan, North Sumatra, during the 30th September Movement and with Brigadier General Ishak Djuarsa, Commander of Kodam I/Iskandar Muda, Brigadir General Darjatmo and Brigadier General Sobirin, Commander of Kodam II/Bukit Barisan and Brigadier General Makmun Murod, Commander of Kodam Sriwijaya, in purging communist, participated in the Anti-Communist purges in Sumatra, supporting the anti-Communist paramilitary group, Pemuda Pancasila in purging communist.

Retiring from the Armed Forces, he became Indonesia ambassador to Sudan and Morocco, from 1967 to 1970 and signed the petition of 50, criticizing the New Order government of Suharto.

His health began to deteriorate in 1982 and died in 1984, being buried in the Kalibata Heroes Cemetery.

References

1921 births
1984 deaths